Sophie de Goede (born 30 June 1999) is a Canadian rugby union player. She plays for Canada internationally and played for Saracens in the Premier 15s.

Biography 
De Goede is the daughter of former Canadian internationals who captained their respective teams, Stephanie and Hans de Goede. In 2017, She was named U Sports’ Rookie of the Year, and in 2018, she won the U Sports’ Player of the Year.

De Goede joined Saracens in the Premier 15s after moving to London in 2020. In 2021, She was awarded Player of the Match after Saracens defeated Loughborough Lightning in the Premier 15s semi-final.

In 2022, De Goede won the Lois and Doug Mitchell U Sports Athlete of the Year Award after she led Queen’s University's Gaels women’s rugby team to their first championship and then helped the women’s basketball team win the bronze medal at the 2022 U Sports Women's Basketball Championship.

De Goede graduated from Queen’s University with a degree in commerce but missed her graduation because she was competing at the 2022 Pacific Four Series in New Zealand. She led Canada for the first time as they beat the Eagles 36–5 in the first round of the series.

De Goede was named Player of the Match after Canada defeated Italy in a warm-up match before the Rugby World Cup. She was named as captain of the Canadian team to the 2021 Rugby World Cup in New Zealand.

References 

Living people
1999 births
Female rugby union players
Canadian female rugby union players
Canada women's international rugby union players